The European qualification for the 2013 World Women's Handball Championship, in Serbia, was played over two rounds. The 2013 hosts Serbia, the 2011 holders Norway were qualified automatically for the World Championship. In the first round of qualification, 16 teams who were not participating at the 2012 European Women's Handball Championship were split into four groups. The group winners and the remaining 12 teams from the European Championship played a playoff afterwards to determine the other nine qualifiers.

Group stage
The draw was held on 24 July 2012 at 11:00 at Vienna, Austria.

Seedings
The seedings were announced on 3 July 2012. After Great Britain withdrew, an update was made.

Group A

Group B

Group C

Group D

Playoff round

Seedings
The seedings were announced on 14 December 2012. The draw took place on 16 December 2012 at 13:00 local time at Belgrade, Serbia.

Matches

First leg

Second leg

References

External links
Eurohandball.com 

2012 in handball
2013 in handball
World Handball Championship tournaments
Qualification for handball competitions